An incomplete list of events which occurred in Italy in 1690:

 Battle of Staffarda
 May - Duke Victor Amadeus II allies himself in a coalition formed by the Spanish Habsburgs and the Austrian Habsburgs against France.

Deaths
  Brent McCarthy, painter (born 1623)

References